David Iosifovich Zaslavsky (January 13, 1880 – March 28, 1965) was a Soviet journalist and literary critic. He joined the Bund (the Jewish socialist party of the Russian Empire) and initially opposed the Bolsheviks, but a few years after the latter established the Soviet Union he became a Communist supporter.

References
"David Zaslavsky, Leading Soviet Journalist, Dead; Was 85", Jewish Telegraphic Agency, March 30, 1965, retrieved 8 Apr. 2017
"Zaslavsky, David", Encyclopaedia Judaica. Encyclopedia.com, retrieved 8 Apr. 2017

1880 births
1965 deaths
20th-century Russian journalists
20th-century Russian male writers
Journalists from Kyiv
Expelled members of the Communist Party of the Soviet Union
Recipients of the Order of Lenin
Recipients of the Order of the Red Banner of Labour
Bundists
Fyodor Dostoyevsky scholars
Jewish Russian writers
Journalists from the Russian Empire
Literary critics from the Russian Empire
Mensheviks
Russian bibliographers
Russian literary critics
Russian male journalists
Russian Marxists
Russian revolutionaries
Russian social democrats
Soviet journalists

Soviet literary critics
Yiddish-language journalists
Burials at Novodevichy Cemetery